Deirdre Hargey is an Irish Sinn Féin politician and former Minister for Communities within the Northern Ireland Executive, and a former Lord Mayor of Belfast. 

Hargey was co-opted to the Northern Ireland Assembly in 2020 to replace Máirtín Ó Muilleoir. She was appointed as Minister for Communities at the formation of the 6th Executive on 11 January 2020. On 15 June 2020, Carál Ní Chuilín replaced her as minister on a temporary basis, due to Hargey's ill health.

References

External links
Sinn Féin official biography

Irish republicans
Living people
Women ministers of the Northern Ireland Executive
Lord Mayors of Belfast
Northern Ireland MLAs 2017–2022
Sinn Féin MLAs
Year of birth missing (living people)
21st-century British women politicians
Northern Ireland MLAs 2022–2027